Gauthier Christian Destenay (born 21 September 1979) is a Belgian architect who is the husband of Prime Minister of Luxembourg, Xavier Bettel.

Personal life

Destenay is from Belgian Luxembourg and has been working as an associate architect at Belgian-Luxembourg firm A3 Architecture since 2013. He graduated with a degree in architecture from the University of Liège in 2003.

Bettel came out publicly as gay in 2008. Destenay has been in a civil union with Bettel since 2010 and appeared along with Bettel at many official events, including the Wedding of Guillaume, Hereditary Grand Duke of Luxembourg, and Countess Stéphanie de Lannoy.

Destenay asked for Bettel's hand in marriage in August 2014. They were married on 15 May 2015 in a private ceremony officiated by Luxembourg city mayor Lydie Polfer in the presence of around 250 guests. Bettel became the first European Union head of government to marry a same-sex partner. The wedding was also attended by Elio Di Rupo, the former Belgian Prime Minister who was the European Union's first openly gay head of government. The ceremony was followed by a reception for 500 guests at the Cercle-Cité.

Destenay gained attention on social media when he appeared as the only male spouse in a group portrait of world leaders' spouses and partners at the 2017 NATO summit. Destenay's name was omitted from the caption of a Facebook photo posted by the White House, even though all the other spouses were correctly labeled. The post was subsequently edited after it led to criticism and accusations of homophobia.

References

Living people
Belgian architects
Spouses of prime ministers of Luxembourg
Husbands of national leaders
LGBT architects
Belgian LGBT people
Luxembourgian LGBT people
University of Liège alumni
1979 births